Hoogblokland is a village in the Dutch province of South Holland. It is a part of the municipality of Molenlanden, and lies about 4 km north of Gorinchem.

In 2001, the village of Hoogblokland had 935 inhabitants. The built-up area of the village was 0.25 km², and contained 372 residences.
The statistical area "Hoogblokland", which also can include the peripheral parts of the village, as well as the surrounding countryside, has a population of around 1100.

Hoogblokland was a separate municipality until 1986, when it became a part of Giessenlanden.

References

Populated places in South Holland
Former municipalities of South Holland
Molenlanden